Amphibians are ectothermic, tetrapod vertebrates of the class Amphibia. All living amphibians belong to the group Lissamphibia. They inhabit a wide variety of habitats, with most species living within terrestrial, fossorial, arboreal or freshwater aquatic ecosystems. Thus amphibians typically start out as larvae living in water, but some species have developed behavioural adaptations to bypass this.

A list of amphibians organizes the class of amphibian by family and subfamilies and mentions the number of species in each of them.

The list below largely follows Darrel Frost's Amphibian Species of the World (ASW), Version 5.5 (31 January 2011). Another classification, which largely follows Frost, but deviates from it in part is the one of AmphibiaWeb, which is run by the California Academy of Sciences and several of universities. The major differences between these two classifications are:

 Frost's ASW has split several families from other families (i.e. elevated to distinct families), whereas AmphibiaWeb has not (i.e., keeping them within the original families as subfamilies):
 From Dendrobatidae: Aromobatidae
 From Myobatrachidae: Limnodynastidae
 From Ranidae: Ceratobatrachidae, Dicroglossidae, Mantellidae, Micrixalidae, Nyctibatrachidae, Petropedetidae, Phrynobatrachidae, Ptychadenidae, Pyxicephalidae, Ranixalidae, Rhacophoridae
 AmphibiaWeb has also split a few families off from other families (i.e. elevated to distinct families), where Frost's ASW has not (i.e., keeping them within the original families):
 From Alytidae: Discoglossidae
 From Leiopelmatidae: Ascaphidae
 From Ambystomatidae: Dicamptodontidae
 From Caeciliidae: Scolecomorphidae, Typhlonectidae
 From Ichthyophiidae: Uraeotyphlidae



Class Amphibia

There are a total of 8216 amphibian species in three orders.

Order Anura: frogs and toads

, 7243 species of frogs and toads are recognised by Amphibian Species of the World.

Suborder Archaeobatrachia
Family Alytidae – painted frogs or disc-tongued frogs, 12 species. Includes the genus Discoglossus (5 species) which is sometimes considered a distinct family, Discoglossidae.
Family Bombinatoridae – firebelly toads, 8 species
Family Leiopelmatidae – New Zealand primitive frogs, 3 species in genus Leiopelma.  
Family Ascaphidae – tailed frogs. Two species in  genus Ascaphus. Sometimes considered part of family Leiopelmatidae.

Suborder Mesobatrachia
Family Megophryidae – litter frogs or short legged toads, 268 species
Subfamily Megophryinae – Asian spadefoot toads, 106 species 
Family Pelobatidae – European spadefoot toads, 6 species
Family Pelodytidae – parsley frogs, 5 species
Family Pipidae – tongueless frogs, 41 species
Family Rhinophrynidae – Mexican burrowing toad, 1 species
Family Scaphiopodidae – American spadefoot toads, 7 species

Suborder Neobatrachia
Family Allophrynidae – Tukeit Hill frogs, 3 species
Family Alsodidae – 30 species 
Family Arthroleptidae – screeching frogs or squeakers, 149 species
Subfamily Arthroleptinae – 67 species
Subfamily Astylosterninae – 30 species 
Subfamily Leptopelinae – 52 species
Family: Batrachylidae, 12 species
Superfamily Brachycephaloidea – 1170 species
Family Brachycephalidae – saddleback toads, 74 species
Family Craugastoridae – 865 species
Subfamily Ceuthomantinae – 573 species; includes species formerly in subfamily Strabomantinae
Subfamily Craugastorinae – 139 species
Subfamily Holoadeninae – 153 species
Family Eleutherodactylidae – 201 species
Subfamily Eleutherodactylinae – 217 species
Subfamily Phyzelaphryninae – 12 species
Family Brevicipitidae – 36 species
Family Bufonidae – true toads, 627 species
Family Calyptocephalellidae – 5 species
Family Centrolenidae – glass frogs, 156 species
Subfamily: Centroleninae –  119 species
Subfamily: Hyalinobatrachiinae – 35 species
Family Ceratobatrachidae – 102 species
Subfamily Alcalinae – 5 species
Subfamily Ceratobatrachinae – 90 species
Subfamily Liuraninae – 7 species 
Family Ceratophryidae – 12 species, formerly contained Batrachylidae and Telmatobiidae as subfamilies
Family Conrauidae – 6 species
Family Cycloramphidae – 36 species, formerly contained Alsodidae as subfamily
Superfamily Dendrobatoidea – 328 species 
Family Aromobatidae – 128 species, considered a subfamily of Dendrobatidae by AmphibiaWeb
Subfamily Allobatinae – 55 species
Subfamily Anomaloglossinae – 34 species
Subfamily Aromobatinae – 38 species
Family Dendrobatidae – poison dart frogs, 200 species
Subfamily Colostethinae, 66 species
Subfamily Dendrobatinae, 61 species
Subfamily Hyloxalinae, 72 species
Family Dicroglossidae – 212 species
Subfamily Dicroglossinae – 197 species
Subfamily Occidozyginae – 15 species
Family Heleophrynidae – ghost frogs, 7 species
Family Hemiphractidae – 118 species
Subfamily Cryptobatrachinae – 8 species
Subfamily Hemiphractinae – 110 species
Family Hemisotidae – shovelnose frogs, 9 species
Family Hylidae – tree frogs, 1036 species
Subfamily Hylinae – 747 species
Subfamily Pelodryadinae – 222 species
Subfamily Phyllomedusinae – 67 species
Family Hylodidae – 47 species
Family Hyperoliidae – sedge frogs or bush frogs, 228 species
Subfamily Hyperoliinae – 203 species
Subfamily Kassininae – 25 species
Family Leiopelmatidae – 3 species; formerly part of Ascaphidae
Family Leiuperidae – 86 species
Family Leptodactylidae – southern frogs or tropical frogs, 219 species
Subfamily Leiuperinae – 101 species
Subfamily Leptodactylinae – 103 species
Subfamily Paratelmatobiinae – 14 species 
Family Mantellidae – 231 species, formerly considered part of the family Ranidae
Subfamily: Boophinae – 79 species
Subfamily: Laliostominae – 7 species
Subfamily: Mantellinae – 145 species
Family Micrixalidae – 24 species, considered part of the family Ranidae by AmphibiaWeb
Family Microhylidae – narrow-mouthed frogs, 698 species
Subfamily Adelastinae – 1 species 
Subfamily Asterophryinae – 349 species
Subfamily Cophylinae – 113 species
Subfamily Dyscophinae – 3 species
Subfamily Gastrophryninae – 79 species
Subfamily Hoplophryninae – 3 species
Subfamily Kalophryninae – 26 species
Subfamily Melanobatrachinae – 1 species
Subfamily Microhylinae – 101 species
Subfamily Otophryninae – 6 species
Subfamily Phrynomerinae – 5 species
Subfamily Scaphiophryninae – 11 species
Superfamily Myobatrachoidea – 132 species
Family Limnodynastidae, 43 species; considered a subfamily of Myobatrachidae by AmphibiaWeb
Family Myobatrachidae – Australian ground frogs, 85 species
Family Nasikabatrachidae – 2 species; formerly included in family Sooglossidae
Family Nyctibatrachidae – 39 species; formerly considered part of the family Ranidae
Subfamily Astrobatrachinae – 1 species
Subfamily Lankanectinae – 2 species
Subfamily Nyctibatrachinae – 36 species
Family Odontobatrachidae – 5 species
Family Odontophrynidae – 52 species
Family Petropedetidae – 13 species; formerly considered part of Ranidae
Family Phrynobatrachidae – 95 species; formerly considered part of Ranidae
Family Ptychadenidae – 60 species, formerly considered part of Ranidae
Family Pyxicephalidae – 85 species; formerly considered part of Ranidae
Subfamily Cacosterninae – 79 species
Subfamily Pyxicephalinae – 6 species
Family Ranidae – true frogs, 409 species
Family Ranixalidae – 18 species, formerly considered part of the family Ranidae
Family Rhacophoridae – moss frogs, 430 species, formerly considered part of the family Ranidae
Subfamily Buergeriinae – 5 species
Subfamily Rhacophorinae – 425 species
Family Sooglossidae Seychelles frogs, 4 species.
Family Telmatobiidae – 63 species

Order Caudata: Salamanders

, 759 species of salamanders are recognised by Amphibian Species of the World.

Suborder Cryptobranchoidea

Family Cryptobranchidae – giant salamanders, 4 species
Family Hynobiidae – Asiatic salamanders, 81 species
 Subfamily Hynobiinae, 71 species
 Subfamily Onychodactylinae – 10 species

Suborder Salamandroidea

Family Ambystomatidae – mole salamanders, 37 species. The Pacific mole salamanders of genus Dicamptodon (4 species) are considered a distinct family, Dicamptodontidae, by AmphibiaWeb: 
Family Amphiumidae – amphiumas or Congo eels, 3 species
Family Plethodontidae – lungless salamanders, 488 species
 Subfamily Hemidactyliinae – 382 species; includes species formerly assigned to subfamilies  Bolitoglossinae and Spelerpinae.
 Subfamily: Plethodontinae – 106 species
Family Proteidae – mudpuppies and waterdogs, 9 species
Family Rhyacotritonidae – torrent salamanders, 4 species
Family Salamandridae – true salamanders and newts, 128 species
 Subfamily Pleurodelinae, 110 species
 Subfamily Salamandrinae, 16 species
 Subfamily Salamandrininae, 2 species

Suborder Sirenoidea

Family Sirenidae – sirens, 5 species

Order Gymnophiona: Caecilians

, 214 species of caecilians are recognised by Amphibian Species of the World.

Family Caeciliidae – common caecilians, 44 species
Family Chikilidae – 4 species
Family Dermophiidae – 14 species
Family Herpelidae – 10 species
Family Ichthyophiidae – fish caecilians, 57 species. The genus Uraeotyphlus (7 species) is sometimes considered a distinct family, Uraeotyphlidae.
Family Indotyphlidae – 24 species
Family Rhinatrematidae – beaked caecilians, 13 species
Family Scolecomorphidae – 6 species; formerly considered a subfamily of Caeciliidae
Family Siphonopidae – 28 species
Family Typhlonectidae – 14 species; formerly considered a subfamily of Caeciliidae

See also

List of California amphibians and reptiles
List of amphibian genera
List of prehistoric amphibians
Amphibian

Sources

Frost, Darrel R. (2011). Amphibian Species of the World: an online reference. Version 5.5 (31 January 2011). American Museum of Natural History, New York, US.

External links

 Amphibian Species of the World
 AmphibiaWeb